Hendi Kandi (also Romanized as Hendī Kandī; also known as Hand Kandī, Hend Kandī, Hindi Kandi, and Khindukandi) is a village in Gilvan Rural District, in the Central District of Tarom County, Zanjan Province, Iran. At the 2006 census, its population was 1,048, in 257 families.

References 

Populated places in Tarom County